Glutamate receptor 4 is a protein that in humans is encoded by the GRIA4 gene.

This gene is a member of a family of L-glutamate-gated ion channels that mediate fast synaptic excitatory neurotransmission. These channels are also responsive to the glutamate agonist, alpha-amino-3-hydroxy-5-methyl-4-isoxazolpropionate (AMPA). Some haplotypes of this gene show a positive association with schizophrenia. Alternatively spliced transcript variants encoding different isoforms have been found for this gene. Like the other AMPA receptor subunits, GluA4 occurs as flip and flop spliced variant. In addition, GluA4 CTD long and short isoforms exist, and presumably an ATD-only isoform (433 aa).

Interactions 

GRIA4 has been shown to interact with CACNG2, GRIP1, PICK1 and PRKCG.

RNA editing
Several ion channels and neurotransmitters receptors pre-mRNa are substrates for ADARs. This includes 5 subunits of the glutamate receptor ionotropic AMPA glutamate receptor subunits (Glur2, Glur3, Glur4) and Kainate receptor subunits (Glur5, Glur6).  Glutamate-gated ion channels are made up of four subunits per channel.  Their function is in the mediation of fast neurotransmission to the brain.  The diversity of the subunits is determined, as well as RNA splicing, by RNA editing events of the individual subunits.  This give rise to the necessary diversity of the receptors.  GluR4 is a gene product of the GRIA4 gene, and its pre-mRNA is subject to RNA editing.

Type 
A to I RNA editing is catalyzed by a family of adenosine deaminases acting on RNA (ADARs) that specifically recognize adenosines within double-stranded regions of pre-mRNAs and deaminate them to inosine. Inosines are recognised as guanosine by the cells translational machinery. There are three members of the ADAR family ADARs 1–3, with ADAR 1 and ADAR 2 being the only enzymatically active members.ADAR3 is thought to have a regulatory role in the brain. ADAR1 and ADAR 2 are widely expressed in tissues, while ADAR 3 is restricted to the brain. The double-stranded regions of RNA are formed by base-pairing between residues in the close to region of the editing site with residues usually in a neighboring intron but can be an exonic sequence. The region that base pairs with the editing region is known as an Editing Complementary Sequence (ECS).

Location 
The pre-mRNA of this subunit is edited at one position.
The R/G editing site is located in exon 13 between the M3 to M4 region.  Editing results in a codon change from an Arginine (AGA) to a Glycine (GGA). The location of editing corresponds to a bipartite ligand interaction domain of the receptor.((((((37))))))The R/G site is found at amino acid 769 immediately before the 3-amino-acid-long flip and flop modules introduced by alternative splicing.  Flip and Flop forms are present in both edited and nonedited versions of this protein.
The editing complementary sequence (ECS) is found in an intronic sequence close to the exon. The intronic sequence includes a 5' splice site, and the predicted double-stranded region is 30 base pairs in length.  The adenosine residue is mismatched in genomically encoded transcript, however this is not the case following editing. Despite similar sequences to the Q/R site of GluR-B, editing this site does not occur in GluR-3 pre-mRNA. Editing results in the targeted adenosine, which is mismatched prior to editing in the double-stranded RNA structure to become matched after editing.  The intronic sequence involved contains a 5' donor splice site.

Conservation 
Editing also occurs in rat.

Regulation 
Editing of GluR-3 is regulated in rat brain from low levels in embryonic stage to a large increase in editing levels at birth.  In humans, 80-90% of GRIA3 transcripts are edited. The absence of the Q/R site editing in this glutamate receptor subunit is due to the absence of necessary intronic sequence required to form a duplex.

Consequences

Structure 
Editing results in a codon change  from (AGA) to (GGA), an R to a G change at the editing site.

Function 
AMPA receptors that occur in the flop form desensitise faster than the flip form. Editing at R/G site allows for faster recovery from desensitisation. Unedited Glu-R at this site have slower recovery rates.  Editing, therefore, allows sustained response to rapid stimuli.

Splicing

A crosstalk between editing and splicing may occur here. Editing takes place before splicing. Like the other AMPA receptor subunits, GluA4 occurs as flip and flop spliced variant. Editing is also thought to affect splicing at this site.

See also 
 AMPA receptor

References

Further reading

External links 
 

Ionotropic glutamate receptors